Madiah Abdalla is a Sudanese journalist and the first female chief editor of the Sudanese newspaper El Meidan since 2011, the Sudanese Communist Party newspaper. She is among the pioneer women in journalism following the steps of women's rights activists, such as Fatima Ahmed Ibrahim in the early forties, who issued the Women's Voice newspaper.

Career 
Abdalla started her career as a journalist at the El Meidan newspaper in 1985. She then worked for different newspapers, such as Alayam. Abdalla also wrote a number of columns in El Meidan after the Comprehensive Peace Agreement CPA in Sudan.

Work 
Abdalla is a women's rights activist, calling for women's equality and strives to reduce the gender discrimination gap in Sudan. She has written articles about women's issues in different online portals, such as the popular forum Sudaneseonline.

Arrest and court case 
As a result of her writing, Abdalla has been subject to detention and faced trial in April 2017. In another case in 2014, where Abdalla faced accusations by the Sudan National Intelligence and Security Service (NISS) of publishing false news, she was found guilty.

References

Year of birth missing (living people)
Living people
Sudanese editors
Sudanese women editors
Sudanese women's rights activists
Sudanese women writers
Sudanese communists
Communist women writers
20th-century Sudanese writers
21st-century Sudanese writers
Sudanese journalists
Sudanese Communist Party politicians